Eddie Wayne Hill (born May 13, 1957) is a former American football running back in the National Football League (NFL) who played for the Los Angeles Rams and Miami Dolphins. He played college football for the Memphis Tigers. Hill was drafted by the Rams in the second round of the 1979 NFL Draft.

He was traded from the Rams to the Dolphins in 1981.

Personal life 
On March 30, 1989, Hill was arrested for possession of cocaine, in Fort Lauderdale, Florida. The next day, he was released on a US$1000 bond.

FAMILY: Eddie has four children:Valencia, Quadtrine, Blaize and Kyra. 

In recent years, Hill has remitting brain cancer. He also believes that he has CTE, a neurodegenerative head injury, but he does not regret playing football.

References

1957 births
Living people
American football running backs
Los Angeles Rams players
Miami Dolphins players
Memphis Tigers football players